Jacob N. Donohoo (December 16, 1853 – November 11, 1917) was an American state politician and banker in Arkansas. He served several terms in the Arkansas House of Representatives after first winning election in 1876 when he was 22. He helped fundraise for the Masonic Temple in Pine Bluff, part of the Sovereign Grand Lodge of Free and Accepted Masons.

He was born in Cleveland, Tennessee. He moved to Arkansas in 1870. He married and owned a 160-acre farm in Marvell, Arkansas. He was a Republican and a Quaker.

Donohoo also worked as an internal revenue collector and banker. Knoxville, Tennessee commercial artist LaRoy A. Tate was his grandson.

See also
African-American officeholders during and following the Reconstruction era

References

1853 births
1917 deaths
People from Cleveland, Tennessee
Republican Party members of the Arkansas House of Representatives
19th-century American politicians
People from Phillips County, Arkansas
19th-century Quakers
20th-century Quakers
American Quakers